Improper Conduct may refer to:

 Improper Conduct (1984 film), documentary directed by Néstor Almendros and Orlando Jiménez Leal
 Improper Conduct (1994 film), by Everest Pictures directed by Jag Mundhra and starring Steven Bauer, Tahnee Welch and Nia Peeples
 Misconduct

See also
 Conduct (disambiguation)